Richard Walter John Hely-Hutchinson, 6th Earl of Donoughmore  (2 March 1875 – 19 October 1948), styled Viscount Suirdale until 1900, was an Anglo-Irish peer and Conservative politician. He served as Under-Secretary of State for War under Arthur Balfour between 1903 and 1905.

Background and education
Donoughmore was the son of John Hely-Hutchinson, 5th Earl of Donoughmore, and Frances Isabella Stephens, daughter of General William Frazer Stephens. He was educated at Eton. In November 1901 he was promoted to Captain of the 3rd (Militia) Battalion, The Royal Irish Regiment, and the following January he resigned his commission.

Political career
Donoughmore succeeded his father in the earldom in 1900 and took his seat in the House of Lords. He served as Under-Secretary of State for War from 1903 to 1905 in the Unionist administration headed by Arthur Balfour. From 1911 he was Lord Chairman of Committees of the House of Lords. He was elected Grand Master of the Grand Lodge of Ireland in 1913, a post he held until his death. In 1916 he was part of the Mesopotamia Commission of Inquiry. He was made a Knight of the Order of St Patrick in 1916 and sworn of the Privy Council in 1918. In June 1920, he was one of three candidates for the post of Governor-General of Australia presented to the Australian prime minister Billy Hughes, along with Lord Forster and General Seely.

In 1921 Lord Donoughmore was elected one of the fifteen Peers of the Realm resident in the South (elected by a constituency of all Southern Ireland peers) to be a member of the Senate of Southern Ireland under the Government of Ireland Act 1920. The Senate convened in 1921 but was boycotted by Irish nationalists. Donoughmore did not attend its first meeting. In 1929 he chaired the Committee on Ministers' Powers following Viscount Hewart's controversial book, The New Despotism, in which Hewart asserted that the rule of law in Britain was being undermined by the executive at the expense of the legislature and the courts. The book was very controversial and led to the committee. The report rejected Hewart's arguments.

In 1927 he also led the Donoughmore Commission that recommended a new way of governing Ceylon (now Sri Lanka), introducing universal suffrage and trying to involve each ethnic group fairly.

Family
Lord Donoughmore married at St. Michael's Church, Chester Square, on 21 December 1901, Elena Maria Grace, daughter of Michael P. Grace. She died on 22 February 1944. Lord Donoughmore died in October 1948, aged 73, and was succeeded in the earldom by his son, John.

References

External links

 

1875 births
1948 deaths
Knights of St Patrick
Irish Unionist Party politicians
Members of the Privy Council of the United Kingdom
People educated at Eton College
Members of the Senate of Southern Ireland
Members of the London School Board
Richard
Earls of Donoughmore